Kevin Walter Frank (born January 13, 1957) is a Canadian actor, director, television host and writer. He is best known as the host of television game shows The Next Line, Kidstreet and Pet Project.

Filmography

Film

Television

Production staff

References

External links
 

1957 births
Living people
20th-century Canadian male actors
21st-century Canadian male actors
Canadian game show hosts
Canadian male comedians
Canadian male film actors
Canadian male television actors
Canadian male voice actors
Male actors from Ontario
People from Welland